Maanyan or Maʼanyan (also Maanjan or Maanyak Dayak) is an Austronesian language belonging to the East Barito languages. It is spoken by about 150,000 Ma'anyan people (subgroup of Dayak people) living in the province of Central Kalimantan and South Kalimantan, Indonesia. It is closely related to the Malagasy language spoken in Madagascar.

Phonology

Consonants 

 can also be heard as a tap sound .

Vowels 

Connection with Malagasy 
The Malagasy language is an Austronesian language spoken in Madagascar. Malagasy is believed to have originated from the Southeast Barito language, and Ma'anyan is believed to be its closest relative, with numerous Malay and Javanese loanwords. It is known that Ma'anyan people were brought as labourers and slaves by Malay and Javanese people in their trading fleets, which reached Madagascar by ca. 50–500 AD. There is high lexical similarity with other East Barito languages like Paku (77%) and Dusun Witu (75%).

Vocabulary 
Vocabulary comparison between Malay, Banjarese, Ma'anyan, and Malagasy.

References

External links

Ma'anyan language and grammar (in Ma'anyan)

East Barito languages
Languages of Indonesia